Atithi Bhooto Bhava is an Indian Hindi-language horror comedy film written by Aniket Wakchaure and directed by Hardik Gajjar. It features Jackie Shroff, Pratik Gandhi and Sharmin Segal in lead roles. The film went on floors in January 2021. It was released on ZEE5 on September 23, 2022.

Plot
Srikant's life turns upside down when he bumps into a middle-aged ghost who claims to be his grandson from his previous birth. Things take an even more comical turn when the ghost seeks Srikant's help to meet his long-lost love. He decides to help the ghost and is supported by his girlfriend Netra.

Cast
 Jackie Shroff as Makhan Singh
 Prabhjyot Singh as Young Maakhan
 Pratik Gandhi as Srikant Shirodkar 
 Sharmin Segal as Netra Banerjee 
 Divinaa Thackur as Sucharita Singh
 Sunil Shakya as Radhey
 Simran Sharma as Young Manju

Soundtrack 

The music of the film is composed by Prasad S.

Reception 
Filmfare rated the film 3 out of 5 stars and wrote "The film leans heavily on Jackie Shroff's charm. He's totally likeable as a friendly ghost". 
Abhishek Srivastava of Times of India also rated the film 3 out of 5 stars.  
Deepa Gahlot writing for Rediff.com rated the film 2 out of 5 stars and wrote "The film coasts along on Jackie Shroff's sparkling screen presence."
Nandini Ramnath of Scroll.in commented, "Jackie Shroff, patron saint of fun times, is a good choice as the ghost whose heartache hasn’t reached the twinkle in his eyes."

References

External links
 
Atithi Bhooto Bhava on ZEE5
 

Indian fantasy comedy films 
2020s Hindi-language films